Whistler's Van is a children's novel by Idwal Jones. Set in rural Wales shortly after World War I, it tells the story of a young farmboy, Gwilyn, who spends one summer traveling with the gypsies. The novel, illustrated by Zhenya Gay, was first published in 1936 and was a Newbery Honor recipient in 1937.

References

External links
 

1936 American novels
1936 children's books
American children's novels
Fictional representations of Romani people
Newbery Honor-winning works
Novels set in Wales
Romani in Wales